The 2021 Dublin Senior Hurling Championship was the 134th and current staging of the Dublin Senior Hurling Championship since its establishment by the Dublin County Board in 1887. The championship began on 3 September 2021 and ended on 13 November 2021.

Cuala entered the championship as the defending champions, however, they were beaten by Kilmacud Crokes at the semi-final stage.

The final was played on 13 November 2021 at Parnell Park in Dublin, between Kilmacud Crokes and Na Fianna, in what was their first ever meeting in a final. Kilmacud Crokes won the match by 4-26 to 2-25 - the first ever to be settled in extra time - to claim their sixth championship title overall and a first title since 2014.

Team changes

There were no changes in personnel in terms of the participating teams as a result of the suspension of promotion/relegation in 2020 due to the impact of the COVID-19 pandemic on Gaelic games.

Group stage

Group 1

Group 2

Group 3

Group 4

Relegation stage

Playoffs

Knockout stage

Quarter-finals

Semi-finals

Final

References

External links
 Dublin GAA website

Dublin Senior Hurling Championship
Dublin Senior Hurling Championship
Dublin Senior Hurling Championship